NB: This list excludes films that feature illegally run street races unless legitimate races are integral to the storyline.

See also
List of sports films
List of highest grossing sports films

References

Auto racing films
Auto racing